The Wheelchair rugby tournament at the 2020 Summer Paralympics in Tokyo, Japan was the seventh edition of Wheelchair rugby as a Paralympic sport since its debut as a demonstration sport at the 1996 Summer Paralympics in Atlanta. The competition was hosted at the Yoyogi National Stadium and was held from 25 to 29 August 2021.

Eight teams competed in the competition which included the debutant of Denmark at the Paralympics. The eight teams were separated into two groups of four with the top two teams from each group qualifying through to the semi-finals while the bottom two played off in the fifth and seventh place match respectively. The remaining four teams then played-off in two semi-finals with the winners going through to the gold medal play-off while the losers met in the bronze-medal match.

Great Britain won the gold medal, the first European team ever to do so, with a 54-49 victory over the United States. It was also Great Britain's first medal in the sport at the seventh attempt. Hosts Japan won bronze with victory over Australia.

Qualification

Schedule

Medalists

Tournament

Group A

Group B

Knockout stage
Medal round bracket

Classification round

Seventh place Match

Fifth place Match

Semi finals

Bronze-medal match

Gold-medal match

References

External links
 International Wheelchair Rugby Federation (IWRF)
Results book 

 
2020
2020 Summer Paralympics events
International rugby union competitions hosted by Japan
2021 in wheelchair rugby